Margery Lyster or Lister, nee Horsman (died 1565) was an English courtier in the 1520s and 1530s.

Career
She became a Maid of Honour at court, and is recorded in the service of three queens consort of Henry VIII of England. Her dates of birth and death are uncertain, the burial of a "Margareta Lyster" at St Martin-in-the-Fields was recorded in July 1565.

Purkoy
Margery was involved in the business of placing 15 year old Anne Bassett, a daughter of Lady Lisle, at court. She is the source of information about Anne Boleyn's dog Purkoy. The name is pourquoi, French for Why?

Thomas Broke wrote to Lady Lisle on 18 December 1535 that "Mistress Margery Horsman" had told him how much Anne had delighted in "little Purkoy", presumably one of her many gifts to Anne. Sadly, Purkoy had died from a fall, and for a time, according to Margery, there "durst nobody tell her Grace of it, till it pleaseth the Kings Highness to tell her Grace of it". Broke's letter does not say when or where Purkoy died, he was writing to encourage Lady Lisle to send Anne another dog. 

Lady Lisle sent Margery a jewellery box in March 1536. Most of the letters mentioning Margery are part of the Lisle Papers, an important source for life at the Tudor court.

Finding positions for young women at court

Now married and known as Mistress Lyster or Lady Lyster, in February 1537 she and another Mistress Margery were asked by John Husee to find a place for Katherine Basset as a chamberer or lady in waiting to the newly married Countess of Sussex. Lyster explained that the three places in the countess' household were filled, but offered to take Katherine as her own companion or place her with young Mrs Norris.

Lyster would bring Katherine to the queen's chamber every day, the result desired by her mother Lady Lisle. Lyster advised that if Katherine came to court, she would need silk gowns and kirtles and good attirements for her head and neck,

Jewels of Jane Seymour
By October 1537, Lady Lyster was in charge of the jewels of Jane Seymour. An inventory was made of the queen's beads, jewels, pomanders, tablets, girdles, borders, brooches, bracelets, buttons, aglets, and chains, in the care of Mistress Lyster. Many of the items described were gold decorated with enamel and few pieces were set with gems.

As a "gentlewoman of the privy chamber to the late Queen Jane", on 29 November 1537, she was given a discharge or receipt for the late queen's jewels.

Marriage and family

She married Michael Lyster (died 1551) of Hurstbourne Priors, a son of Richard Lyster, in 1537. Richard Lyster had a house in Southampton, and was buried nearby at St Michael's Church, where there is a monument. Henry VIII gave Margery Lyster a lease of Newbo Abbey in Lincolnshire as an income.

Her children included:
 Lawrence Lyster
 Charles Lyster (1534-1613).

Michael Lyster had a son, Richard Lyster (1532-1558), from his first marriage to Elizabeth Delabere. Richard Lyster junior married Mary Wriothesley, a daughter of Thomas Wriothesley, 1st Earl of Southampton. 

A note in an inventory of jewels of Mary I of England mentions that she gave a "heart" from a rosary of lapis lazuli beads to the "Lady Lyster's daughter".

References

Household of Jane Seymour
Household of Anne Boleyn
Household of Catherine of Aragon
Ladies of the Privy Chamber
British maids of honour